During the 2000–01 Danish football season, F.C. Copenhagen competed in the Danish Superliga.

Season summary
After several seasons of midtable mediocrity, new manager Roy Hodgson led Copenhagen to their first league title since 1993. However, at the end of the season Hodgson moved to Italian club Udinese.

Squad
Squad at end of season

Results

Top goalscorers

See also
2000–01 Danish Superliga

References

F.C. Copenhagen seasons
Copenhagen